Gasparotto is an Italian surname. Notable people with the surname include:

Enrico Gasparotto (born 1982), Italian cyclist
Gabriel Gasparotto (born 1993), Brazilian footballer
Leopoldo Gasparotto
Luca Gasparotto (born 1995), Canadian soccer player
Luigi Gasparotto (1873–1954), Italian lawyer and politician
Marta Gasparotto (born 1996), Italian softball player

See also
Gasparotti

Italian-language surnames